Gamaka may refer to:

Gamaka (storytelling), a form of storytelling by singing that originated in Karnataka, India
Gamaka (music), types of ornamentations used in Indian classical music